Yuma County is a county in the southwestern corner of the U.S. state of Arizona. As of the 2020 census, its population was 203,881. The county seat is Yuma.

Yuma County includes the Yuma, Arizona Metropolitan Statistical Area.

The county borders three states: Sonora, Mexico, to the south, and two other states to the west, across the Colorado River: California of the United States and the Mexican state of Baja California.

Being 63.8% Hispanic in 2020, Yuma is Arizona's largest majority-Hispanic county.

History
Long settled by Native Americans of indigenous cultures for thousands of years, this area was controlled by the Spanish Empire in the colonial era. In the 19th century, it was part of independent Mexico before the Mexican–American War and Gadsden Purchase.

Yuma County was one of four original Arizona counties created by the 1st Arizona Territorial Legislature. The county territory was defined as being west of longitude 113° 20' and south of the Bill Williams River. Its original boundaries remained the same until 1982, when La Paz County was created from its northern half.

The original county seat was the city of La Paz; in 1871 it was moved to Arizona City, later renamed as Yuma in 1873.

Economy
This county is the highest crop producer in the state by dollar value per year. Yuma County tops the list for the categories of vegetables + melons + potatoes + sweet potatoes at $782,293,000, and fruits + tree nuts + berries at $62,499,000. Overall this is the second (to Maricopa) producing county for all agricultural products at $1,143,068,000 per year and for organic production. Almost all of the dates (Phoenix dactylifera) in the state are grown here, about  worth $35 million per year. This is the second highest citrus producer behind Maricopa, a distant second in grapefruit, limes, and oranges but producing far more lemons. Some olives, clingstone peaches, and plums are grown here. Yuma County produces almost all of the vegetable seed grown in the state. The average farmer age is the lowest in the state, at 56.6 years.

During the winter agricultural season from November to March, some 40,000 Mexican workers cross the border daily to work in United States fields. The area is watered by the Colorado River, and the sector supplies a large part of the US leafy vegetables. The Yuma Lettuce Days festival and agritourism is connected to Yuma agriculture. Fruits brought $62,499,000, also first in the state, 56th out of >3000 counties in the country. Jojoba (Simmondsia chinensis) is a valuable native crop here. From here it has also been introduced into cultivation in other countries.

The Sweetpotato Whitefly (Silverleaf Whitefly, Bemisia tabaci) is a common pest here. The county is planted with large extents of several crops which serve as hosts.

Date trees (Phoenix dactylifera) were planted here in the 2010s. In this county, plantations suffer from the Carob Moth (Ectomyelois ceratoniae) and the Banks Grass Mite (Oligonychus pratensis).

Leaders in the county are aware their economy is tied to that of Mexican states on the other side of the border; both have to be considered. "There are automotive plants in Ciudad Juárez, across from El Paso; aerospace plants in Mexicali, southwest of Yuma; and medical devices’ manufacturers in Tijuana, near San Diego. On the American side, there is a mix of retail stores, warehouses and trucking companies..."

Because of Yuma County's location along the U.S.-Mexico border, large numbers of aliens entering the United States illegally pass through Yuma County. From October 2004 to July 2005, some 124,400 undocumented foreign nationals were apprehended in the area, a 46% increase over the previous year. In 2015, however, only 6,000 people were apprehended, as the border was fortified and augmented. The number of undocumented immigrants also declined with slumps in the US economy.

The  anticipates many agricultural jobs in the county will soon transition to robotics.

Government
The Board of Supervisors is the governing body of the county and a number of special districts. The board has members from five districts. The Board adopts ordinances, establishes programs, levies taxes, appropriates funds, appoints certain officials, and zones property and regulates development in the unincorporated area. In addition, members of the Board represent the County on numerous intergovernmental agencies.

In Arizona's first 52 years as a state, Yuma County was a primarily Democratic county, only voting for Republicans four times in presidential elections prior to 1968. From 1968 on, it has consistently voted for Republican presidential candidates. In 2016, county voters elected more Democrats to the Board than Republicans for the first time since 2004. However, their margins of victory have been reduced in recent years as the county has rapidly grown in population and become majority-Hispanic. Donald Trump only won the county by 560 votes over Hillary Clinton in the presidential election of 2016. However, Trump's margin did improve to over 4,000 votes as he won the county again in 2020 over Joe Biden.

Geography
The lowest point in the state of Arizona is on the Colorado River in San Luis in Yuma County, where it flows out of Arizona and into Sonora in Mexico.

Yuma County is in the west, and northwestern regions of the north–south Sonoran Desert that extends through Sonora state of Mexico to the border of northern Sinaloa state. West of the county across the Colorado River in southeast California is the Colorado Desert, (a northwestern subregion of the Sonoran Desert). North of the county, with La Paz County the regions merge into the southeastern Mojave Desert. Southwest of Yuma County, is the entirety of Northwest Mexico, at the north shoreline of the Gulf of California, and the outlet of the Colorado River into the Colorado River Delta region, now altered with lack of freshwater inputs. Notable mountains in Yuma County include the Gila Mountains and the Tule Mountains.

Adjacent counties and municipalities

 La Paz County – north
 Maricopa County – east
 Pima County – southeast
 Sonora, Mexico – south
 Baja California, Mexico – southwest
 Imperial County, California – west

Major highways
  Interstate 8
  Historic U.S. Route 80
  U.S. Route 95
  Arizona State Route 195

National protected areas
 Cabeza Prieta National Wildlife Refuge (part)
 Imperial National Wildlife Refuge (part)
 Kofa National Wildlife Refuge (part)

Climate

Demographics

2000 census
As of the census of 2000, there were 160,026 people, 53,848 households, and 41,678 families residing in the county. The population density was 29 people per square mile (11/km2). There were 74,140 housing units at an average density of 13 per square mile (5/km2). The county's racial makeup was 68.3% White, 2.2% Black or African American, 1.6% Native American, 0.9% Asian, 0.1% Pacific Islander, 23.6% from other races, and 3.2% from two or more races. 50.5% of the population were Hispanic or Latino of any race. 43.7% reported speaking Spanish at home Language Map Data Center.

There were 53,848 households, out of which 36.9% had children under the age of 18 living with them, 62.3% were married couples living together, 11.2% had a female householder with no husband present, and 22.6% were non-families. 18.5% of all households were made up of individuals, and 8.9% had someone living alone who was 65 years of age or older. The average household size was 2.86 and the average family size was 3.27.

In the county, the population was spread out, with 28.9% under the age of 18, 10.0% from 18 to 24, 25.6% from 25 to 44, 18.9% from 45 to 64, and 16.5% who were 65 years of age or older. The median age was 34 years. For every 100 females there were 102.0 males. For every 100 females age 18 and over, there were 101.1 males.

The median income for a household in the county was $32,182, and the median income for a family was $34,659. Males had a median income of $27,390 versus $22,276 for females. The per capita income for the county was $14,802. About 15.5% of families and 19.2% of the population were below the poverty line, including 27.9% of those under age 18 and 8.7% of those age 65 or over.

2010 census
As of the 2010 census, there were 195,751 people, 64,767 households, and 48,976 families residing in the county. The racial makeup of the county was 70.4% white, 2.0% black or African American, 1.6% American Indian, 1.2% Asian, 0.2% Pacific islander, 20.8% from other races, and 3.8% from two or more races. Those of Hispanic or Latino origin made up 59.7% of the population. In terms of ancestry, 10.6% were German, 7.4% were English, 6.9% were Irish, and 3.2% were American.

Of the 64,767 households, 41.1% had children under the age of 18 living with them, 56.8% were married couples living together, 13.8% had a female householder with no husband present, 24.4% were non-families, and 19.6% of all households were made up of individuals. The average household size was 2.93 and the average family size was 3.39. The median age was 33.8 years.

The median income for a household in the county was $40,340 and the median income for a family was $42,718. Males had a median income of $36,345 versus $27,262 for females. The per capita income for the county was $18,418. About 17.6% of families and 20.9% of the population were below the poverty line, including 30.7% of those under age 18 and 12.7% of those age 65 or over.

Communities

Cities
 San Luis
 Somerton
 Yuma (county seat)

Town
 Wellton

Census-designated places

 Avenue B and C
 Aztec
 Buckshot
 Dateland
 Donovan Estates
 Drysdale
 El Prado Estates
 Fortuna Foothills
 Gadsden
 Martinez Lake
 Orange Grove Mobile Home Manor
 Padre Ranchitos
 Rancho Mesa Verde
 Tacna
 Wall Lane
 Wellton Hills
 Yuma Proving Ground

Other unincorporated communities
 Mohawk
 Roll

Ghost towns

 Arizona City
 Castle Dome
 Castle Dome Landing
 Colorado City
 Dome
 Filibusters Camp
 Fortuna
 Gila City
 Hyder
 Kofa
 La Laguna
 Mission Camp
 Owl
 Pedrick's
 Polaris

Indian reservations
 Fort Yuma Indian Reservation
 Cocopah Indian Reservation

County population ranking
The population ranking of the following table is based on the 2010 census of Yuma County.

† county seat

See also
 National Register of Historic Places listings in Yuma County, Arizona

Notes

References
Specific

General
 "Cross-Border, Cross-Purposes". The Economist.  August 27–September 2, 2005.

External links
 Yuma County official web site
 

 
Arizona placenames of Native American origin
1864 establishments in Arizona Territory
Populated places established in 1864